Vigilance may refer to:

 Alertness
 Vigilance, a creature ability in the Magic: The Gathering collectible card game
 Vigilance (album), by Threat Signal
 Vigilance (behavioural ecology), the watchfulness of prey for nearby predators
 Vigilance (psychology), the ability to maintain attention and alertness over prolonged periods of time
 Vigilance (video game), a 1998 PC game by SegaSoft
 Vigilance committee, a group of private citizens formed to administer law
 Vigilance committee (trade union)
 Vigilance control, on railways

Airship 
 ZPG-3W Vigilance, largest US Navy non-rigid airship ever built

Ship 
 USS Vigilance (AM-324), a US Navy minesweeper
 Vigilance (fireboat), a fireboat operated by the city of Long Beach, California
 BNS Vigilance, a patrol boat of the Biafran navy

See also 

 Hypervigilance
 Vigilant (disambiguation)
 Vigilante (disambiguation)